The Jones Sewing Machine Company was a British manufacturer of sewing machines founded in 1860 by William Jones and Thomas Chadwick under the name Chadwick and Jones that later become known as the Jones Sewing Machine Company.

History 
William Jones started making sewing machines in 1859 and in 1860 formed a partnership with Thomas Chadwick. As Chadwick & Jones they manufactured sewing machines at Ashton-under-Lyne until 1863. Their machines used designs from Howe and Wilson produced under licence. Thomas Chadwick later joined Bradbury & Co. William Jones opened a factory in Guide Bridge, Manchester in 1869. In 1893 a Jones advertising sheet claimed that this factory was the "Largest Factory in England Exclusively Making First Class Sewing Machines". The firm was renamed as the Jones Sewing Machine Co. Ltd and was later acquired by Brother Industries of Japan, in 1968. The Jones name still appeared on the machines till the late 1980s.
 
The Jones patent for his popular Serpent Neck model appeared in 1879. These were manufactured until 1909.
The "Serpentine" machines formed a lock stitch using a reciprocating (i.e., linear fore/aft motion) boat shuttle, while later models used a vibrating shuttle. The CS Family model was produced for many years. One version of it has "As Supplied to Her Majesty Queen Alexandra" written along the shoulder and like many Jones machines displayed very ornamental decoration ensuring that many are still kept in good condition as decorative items. You can find Jones machines and advertising with reference to her as "Princess Alexandra" and "Queen Alexandra" and there is a reliable account that while at technical school she did use a Jones machine.

Jones was happy to make machines under different names when ordering over 100 machines unlike Singer which would only produce machines with their name on. The different Jones machines can be found appearing under various name such as CWS (Co-operative wholesale society), Whiteley's universal, Federation (which is another machine for the co-operative wholesale society) which are all basically Jones Family CS machines. The Cat-Back design was also sold under the name Eclipse, and The Favourite.

Gallery

See also
 List of sewing machine brands

References 

Sewing machine brands
Defunct manufacturing companies of the United Kingdom
Companies based in Tameside
Japan–United Kingdom relations
British companies established in 1860